The 1915–16 season was the 39th Scottish football season in which Dumbarton competed at national level, entering the Scottish Football League.  In addition Dumbarton played in the Dumbartonshire Charity Cup.

Scottish League

In the second season of war-time football, where the Scottish League was the only national competition which was played, Dumbarton achieved their best league performance in over 20 years by finishing 9th out of 20, with 37 points, 30 behind champions Celtic.

Dumbartonshire Charity Cup
While Dumbarton did not enter the Dumbartonshire Cup, the Dumbartonshire Charity Cup was played for the first time but Dumbarton were knocked out in the first round by Clydebank.

Friendlies
During the season two 'friendlies' were played, both being won, scoring 7 goals for the loss of none.

Player statistics

|}

Source:

Transfers

Players in

Players out 

Source:

In addition James Brown, Alexander Davidson, William McAlpine, John Murray, James Thomson, William Watson and Andrew Wilson all played their final 'first XI' games in Dumbarton colours.

References

Dumbarton F.C. seasons
Scottish football clubs 1915–16 season